Miss Asian Global Pageant (founded August 1, 1987) was initiated as a part of the Asian Heritage Celebration for the County of Santa Clara in 1987, the pageant's top titleholders include the former First Lady of the State of Washington, Mona Lee Locke, wife of Gary Locke and Fala Chen, the 2013 winner of the Huading Award for Best Female Drama Actress.

Background

A 2010 book by cultural anthropologist Afia A. Ofori-Mensa studied the relationships among race, gender, and U.S. national identity using the Miss Asian Global Pageant. She found that "panethnic pageants like Miss Asian Global" which came of age in the 1980s plays an important role in the constitution of national identity "through ideal femininity, in both embodied and rhetorical ways." For the Asian American community, the Miss Asian Global Pageant is the "only cultural institution annually endowing one woman and her racialized, gendered, and classed body, the power to represent an entire nation." The pageant remains one of the few national events that allow for a frontal display of non-mainstream ethnic culture for the American public where contestants wear cultural clothing and reinvigorate heritage ties through community-based projects, service learning, and presentations in their heritage language.

Cultural integration and the introduction of neoliberal values have also been examined through the prism of the Miss Asian Global Pageant extensively by women's studies scholars. Professor Nhi T. Lieu, in studying Miss Asian Global pointed to the pageant's role in promoting capitalism and neoliberal values presented within traditional contexts such as the utilization of the Vietnamese women's garment known as the ao dai. Lieu adds that the role of technology in beauty pageants also enabled the introduction of modernity and consumer goods to many Asian American households in attendance at pageant events.

In reviewing the Cold War legacy and its relationship with Asian American communities in the United States, Ofori-Mensa argues that the Asian American community was able to "utilize pageants strategically, by insisting on the centrality of people of color to U.S. national identity, and by re-imagining the nation as a transnational space where people of color are not systematically excluded."

Titleholders

See also 

 List of beauty contests

References

 
Asian-American culture
Beauty pageants for people of specific ethnic or national descents
Recurring events established in 1987
International beauty pageants
Continental beauty pageants